WTRU (830 kHz) is a commercial AM radio station licensed to Kernersville, North Carolina, and serving the Piedmont Triad.  It is owned by Truth Broadcasting and carries a Christian talk and teaching radio format.  Truth Broadcasting is owned by Stuart Epperson, Jr., son of Stuart Epperson, founder of Salem Communications.  The station is the flagship of the "Truth Network," including WDRU in the Research Triangle, WCRU in Charlotte, WLES in Richmond, Virginia, and KUTR in Salt Lake City.

By day, WTRU transmits with 50,000 watts, the maximum for AM stations in the U.S., but 830 AM is a clear channel frequency reserved for Class A WCCO Minneapolis, so WTRU must reduce power at night to 10,000 watts.  Programming is heard on three FM translator stations in the region. (See below.)

History
The station started as WWMO in Eden, North Carolina, with a Southern gospel and preaching format. In 1995, the call sign was changed to WETR and the station moved to the old Color Tile Building on High Point Road in Greensboro, North Carolina. WETR offered a mix of "entertainment radio" programming that included talk radio such as The Fabulous Sports Babe, Dr. Laura and beach music.

New towers were built outside Walkertown, North Carolina to improve coverage of the entire Greensboro-High Point-Winston-Salem market. In 1997, Hearst-Argyle Television, owner of area NBC affiliate WXII-TV, bought the station and changed callsigns to WXII, and a news radio format was used that included audio from some WXII-TV news broadcasts.  Truth Broadcasting bought the station in June 2000 and, after a few weeks of silence, returned it to the air with the current format and call letters. From 1956 until 1992 the WTRU calls were assigned to the now silenced AM 1600 in Muskegon Heights, Michigan.

Translators
In addition to the main station on 830 AM, WTRU is relayed by three FM translators.

References

External links
 Current home of the WTRU callsign

TRU
Moody Radio affiliate stations
TRU